Helmut Novy (born 31 July 1944) is a German ice hockey player, who competed for SG Dynamo Weißwasser. He won the bronze medal at the 1966 European Championships. He also competed at the 1968 Winter Olympics when the East German team finished in eighth place out of 14. He scored 1 goal in the tournament against the strong Czechoslovakian team.

References 

1944 births
Living people
People from Teplice District
People from Sudetenland
German ice hockey players
Ice hockey players at the 1968 Winter Olympics
Olympic ice hockey players of East Germany